Fox Cities Roller Derby, formerly known as The Fox City Foxz, is a women's flat track roller derby league based in Appleton, Wisconsin. Founded in 2007, the league consists of two travel teams which compete against teams from other leagues. Fox Cities is a member of the Women's Flat Track Derby Association (WFTDA).

Fox Cities history
The league played its first season in 2008.  Although all the league's home bouts are currently played in Appleton, it has also hosted bouts in Fond du Lac, Wisconsin.

The league was accepted into the Women's Flat Track Derby Association Apprentice Program in October 2009, and became a full member of the WFTDA in September 2010.

The production team of "Jam City Rollergirls", a roller derby-themed console game, attempted to learn to skate with Fox Cityz.

League founder and president Delonna "Wring Leader" Reed of the Fox Cityz Foxz has stepped down and the league will be continuing on now known as Fox Cities Roller Derby (FCRD). In September 2015, Fox Cities announced on social media that they will be merging with Appleton's other WFTDA-member league, the Paper Valley Roller Girls, and the new organization will continue to operate under the Fox Cities name.

WFTDA rankings

Paper Valley Rollergirls

Paper Valley Rollergirls (PVRG) was a competing roller derby league also based in Appleton. Founded in 2008, the league consisted of two teams which competed against teams from other leagues. PVRG gained a higher profile following the release of Whip It! In addition to Appleton, the league played home bouts out of Green Bay, Wisconsin.

Paper Valley was accepted into the Women's Flat Track Derby Association Apprentice Program in November 2009, and became a full member of the WFTDA in June 2010. In 2012, PVRG won the Women's Rolling Along the River Tournament. The following season, Paper Valley earned a spot in the newly created Division 2 Playoffs, as a seventh seed in the Kalamazoo tournament. PVRG went (2-2), claiming sixth place, and an international rank of 54th.

In September 2015, Paper Valley announced on social media that they would merge with Appleton's other WFTDA-member league, Fox Cities Roller Derby, and the new organization would continue to operate under the Fox Cities name. Paper Valley's final WFTDA ranking was at 111 in April 2015.

WFTDA rankings as Paper Valley

References

Sports in Appleton, Wisconsin
Roller derby leagues established in 2007
Roller derby leagues in Wisconsin
Women's Flat Track Derby Association Division 3
2007 establishments in Wisconsin